The Trelleborg Parish is a parish belonging to the Diocese of Lund in the Church of Sweden and encompasses Trelleborg Municipality in Sweden. The main church is the church of Saint Nicholas located in Trelleborg. The parish covers a population of 22 807 people (2003).

External links
Official website 

Skåne County
Parishes of the Church of Sweden